The Dubai Butterfly Garden is a garden for butterflies located in the Dubailand area, Al Barsha South 3, Dubai, United Arab Emirates. It is the world's largest and the region's first indoor butterfly garden.

The garden opened in 2015 and has over 15,000 butterflies from 50 species. It includes a butterfly museum, ten climate-controlled domes at temperature of 24 °C, a Koi fish pond in Dome 2, and an educational area. The garden covers an area of 2,600m2. It is located immediately adjacent to the northeast of the Dubai Miracle Garden, with a separate entrance.

See also
 Butterfly house
 Dubai Miracle Garden
 List of butterfly houses

References

External links

 

2015 establishments in the United Arab Emirates
Parks established in 2015
Buildings and structures completed in 2015
Parks in Dubai
Gardens in the United Arab Emirates
Buildings and structures in Dubai
Fauna of the United Arab Emirates
Domes
Butterfly houses
Dubailand